Khanapur-M-Tadakod is a village in Dharwad district of Karnataka, India.

Demographics 
As of the 2011 Census of India there were 144 households in Khanapur-M-Tadakod and a total population of 723 consisting of 378 males and 345 females. There were 87 children ages 0-6.

References

Villages in Dharwad district